Two submarines of the French Navy have borne the name Eurydice:

 , an  launched in 1927 and scuttled in 1942
 , a  launched in 1962 and lost in 1970

French Navy ship names